The Dockerty Cup is an annual association football knock-out competition open to all Victorian clubs across the Victorian football league system. The tournament is named after the former president of Football Federation Victoria Harry Dockerty.

Since 2014 the Cup is also a qualifying competition for the FFA Cup, now known as the Australia Cup, where the four finalists enter the competition proper at the round of 32. The Dockerty cup winner also qualifies to the next season's FV Community Shield, in a one-off match against the current NPL Victoria champion.

History
The competition was established in 1909 and held every season with the exception of 3 years during World War I (1916, 1917, 1918). Following the 1996 season, the Dockerty Cup was in recess before returning in 2004 as the "Crazy John's Cup", it would be run for three seasons before re-entering recess following the 2006 season. A Victorian cup competition was reintroduced in 2011 with a new trophy and known as the "Mirabella Cup" due to naming rights sponsorship. That arrangement lasted only one season, with the competition being named the "FFV State Knockout Cup" in 2012 and 2013. However, in both years, the winner was awarded with the Dockerty Cup trophy. From the 2014 season onwards, it is once again known as the Dockerty Cup.

Format

Eligibility
Participation in the Dockerty Cup is mandatory for the senior men's team from every Victorian club within the National Premier Leagues and the State Leagues, and optional for teams from the Regional Leagues. Because the competition serves as the preliminary rounds for the Australia Cup competition, only one team per Club is eligible. This means that the youth sides of Melbourne Victory Youth and Melbourne City Youth and Western United FC Youth are excluded from the competition, as their parent A-League sides separately participate in the competition.

Additionally if a Victorian club wins the NPL Championship – as occurred with Heidelberg United in the 2018 Dockerty Cup – they are excluded from the preliminary rounds as they have also qualified for the FFA Cup at the round of 32. Instead they join the Dockerty Cup competition in a special playoff round match held the week prior to the semi-finals.

Competition format
The competition acts a classic single-elimination knock-out tournament, with one team progressing from each tie to the next round. Fixtures for each round are determined by a random draw, with teams entering the tournament on a staggered basis, depending on their respective positions in the league hierarchy. The team drawn first hosts the match, with the final being held at a neutral venue. No replays are currently utilised in the Dockerty Cup, with a drawn match going to 30 minutes of extra time and eventually a penalty shoot-out if necessary.

Qualification for subsequent competitions

Australia Cup
Since 2014, the Dockerty Cup has also served as preliminary competition for the FFA Cup, now known as the Australia Cup, from the first qualifying round to the Seventh Round. In 2022 five teams qualify as Victoria's representatives, at the round of 32. 

In 2020, the FFA Cup competition was cancelled due to the COVID-19 pandemic in Australia.

FV Community Shield
Since 2014 the Dockerty Cup winners also qualify for the following season's single-match FV Community Shield, the season opener played against the current NPL Victoria champions.

Prize fund
The prize fund for the 2018 Dockerty Cup is detailed below.

Media coverage
In 2019 it was announced that Football Victoria had signed a three-year broadcast arrangement with YouTube and Facebook that will see the Dockerty Cup's semi-finals and final broadcast live.

Additionally each draw of the Dockerty Cup round's are broadcast live on Football Victoria's Facebook page, while a number of clubs will provide live score updates during each match either via the clubs official website, Facebook, or Twitter.

Records and honours

Dockerty Cup finals (current format since 2014)

 1 Heidelberg United qualified as the 2017 NPL Champions and entered the Cup via an additional playoff match.

List of Dockerty Cup winners (1909–2013)

Overall Honours

Notes

References